Jake Hagood (born March 29, 1991), better known as Who Is Fancy, is an American singer. He co-signed with Scooter Braun and Scott Borchetta on Big Machine Label Group and Dr. Luke on Prescription Songs. His single "Goodbye" was released in early 2015, peaking at number 29 on the Billboard Mainstream Top 40 chart. Fancy was presented at the iHeartMedia Music Summit, although his identity was kept secret.

Early life
Jake Hagood was born March 29, 1991, in Bentonville, Arkansas. He taught himself to play piano at age eleven. He grew up listening to Christian and Country music. After finishing high school in Arkansas, Hagood moved to Nashville, Tennessee to attend Trevecca Nazarene University. The name, "Fancy", was a nickname given to him by coworkers at Forever 21 during this time.

While attending university, Hagood wrote original music and performed around the Nashville area. He left the university after being discovered by producers Scooter Braun, Scott Borchetta, and Dr. Luke. Hagood is openly gay.

Career
Beginning in January 2015, Hagood, his management team, and his record label, built a viral campaign around the singer and his debut single "Goodbye". The single was released without revealing the person behind the "Fancy" pseudonym. A series of pseudo-music videos and a lyric-only clip were viewed more than 4 million times on YouTube, and with early radio support from stations like New York's Z100, the song reached number 29 on the Billboard Mainstream Top 40 chart, number 48 on the Billboard Digital Songs chart, and number 98 on the Billboard Hot 100. Three music videos for the single were released, featuring three different actors lip-syncing to the song. Each video dealt with themes like gender identity and body positivity. A fourth music video featuring the performer himself in the same setting was filmed but never released.

In an interview with USA Today, Hagood said that one of motivations behind the campaign was for people to "know [his] art before they knew [him]". However, the concept met with a mixed response from some of Hagood's friends, including pop singer Meghan Trainor, who says she was vocally against it from the start. "I felt like you're hiding this guy," she told The Canadian Press. "What I loved about (Who is Fancy) was his appearance. He's this bubbly, happy person … he has the confidence, he has everything, and they just — I don't like what they did."

Hagood finally revealed his identity on April 7, 2015, in an appearance on The Tonight Show Starring Jimmy Fallon.

To promote his second single "Boys like You", Who Is Fancy performed with collaborators Meghan Trainor and Ariana Grande on Dancing with the Stars on January 23, 2016.

After "Boys Like You" failed to perform on the charts, Hagood parted ways with manager Braun and Republic. In an interview with The Canadian Press, he said that he hoped to relaunch his career in summer 2016.

In 2016, Hagood was featured on Clean//Photograph, a Taylor Swift and Ed Sheeran mashup by Nashville singer-songwriter Louisa Wendorff. The mashup received good reviews, and was featured in articles on Billboard, Seventeen, and others.

Hagood reflected on his experience with a major label, and how they softened his gay persona: "It was everyone wanting to see me win, and they were like, 'Well, maybe you can't win if you're this (type of person),'" he says. "But maybe I could, you know what I mean?"

Concert tours
Who Is Fancy has opened for both Meghan Trainor's MTrain Tour and Ariana Grande's The Honeymoon Tour.

Discography

Singles

Music videos
 "Goodbye"
 "Boys Like You"

Notes

References

External links
Official website

1991 births
Living people
21st-century American singers
American male pop singers
Big Machine Records artists
American gay musicians
American LGBT singers
American LGBT songwriters
LGBT people from Arkansas
People from Benton County, Arkansas
People from Bentonville, Arkansas
Republic Records artists
Singers from Arkansas
Songwriters from Arkansas
21st-century American male singers
20th-century American LGBT people
21st-century LGBT people
American male songwriters
Gay singers
Gay songwriters
American gay writers